The 2002–03 season was the 105th season of competitive football played by Arsenal. The club retained the FA Cup, a feat last achieved by Tottenham Hotspur in 1982, but finished runners-up to Manchester United in the Premier League. In the UEFA Champions League, defeat to Valencia in the second group stage meant Arsenal exited the competition at the same round for the second successive year.

Arsenal began the new campaign as league and cup double winners, and manager Arsène Wenger sought improvement in the Champions League, a competition the club failed in. The retirement of defender Tony Adams meant French midfielder Patrick Vieira was appointed as captain; Pascal Cygan was signed as a replacement in defence. Other recruitments included defensive midfielders Gilberto Silva and Kolo Touré, while goalkeepers Alex Manninger and Richard Wright departed to join Espanyol and Everton respectively.

In the league, a 4–1 win against Leeds United in September meant the club broke the record for scoring in consecutive games (47), and away league games without defeat (22). The club began 2003 in first position, but subsequently floundered; a draw to Aston Villa in April allowed Manchester United to move joint top. A further draw at Bolton Wanderers meant the league championship was, mathematically, out of Arsenal's hands and defeat to Leeds a week after ended their chances of retaining the league. Consolation came in retaining the FA Cup; a solitary goal scored by midfielder Robert Pires was enough to beat Southampton in the 2003 final.

30 different players represented the club in five competitions and there were 17 different goalscorers. Arsenal's top goalscorer was Thierry Henry, who scored 32 goals in 55 appearances.

Background

Arsenal began the 2001–02 season in good form and a win against Liverpool in December 2001 – having gone down to ten men in the first half, helped them move second in the table. A draw against Southampton on 2 February 2002 started a run of 13 consecutive league wins – a new record, beginning against Everton. Arsenal won the league away to Manchester United at Old Trafford on 8 May 2002; the winning goal was scored by Sylvain Wiltord in the second half. The result meant the team were unbeaten away from home all season, and in scoring four goals against Everton on the final day, became the first team to score in every league match they played. Arsenal completed the double, having beaten Chelsea 2–0 in the 2002 FA Cup Final.

Wenger hoped his team's success would begin an era of dominating English football for years to come, citing a "shift of power". He moreover aimed for significant improvement in the Champions League, a competition where the club failed to reach higher than the quarter-finals. Such was Arsenal's impressive form in late summer, Wenger commented that his team could go the entire season undefeated.

Arsenal's kit sponsorship with O2 came into action in the 2002–03 season, replacing SEGA Dreamcast.

Transfers
Wenger appointed midfielder Patrick Vieira as captain after Tony Adams announced his retirement from football. Defender Lee Dixon left the club after 14 years, retiring at the age of 38. Arsenal did not spend big in the transfer market unlike their rivals and only made subtle additions to the squad: World Cup winner Gilberto Silva and defender Pascal Cygan. English duo Martin Keown and goalkeeper David Seaman extended their stay at the club for two and one more years respectively.

In the January transfer window, defender Matthew Upson was sold to Birmingham City and midfielder Steve Sidwell joined Reading on an undisclosed fee. Goalkeeper Guillaume Warmuz signed a short-term contract with Arsenal, as cover for Seaman, Stuart Taylor and Rami Shaaban.

In

Out

Pre-season
To prepare for the upcoming season Arsenal played a number of friendlies. On 17 June, they played Stevenage for Paul Fairclough's managerial testimonial, then travelled abroad to play Austrian teams Neuberg, and Rapid Wien, before competing in the Tri-team pre-season tournament, also in Austria, winning matches against both Panathinaikos and Roma. Their last match in Austria consisted of a strong 3–1 win against 1860 Munich, before travelling to Belgium to play Beveren, and eventually back to England, beating Barnet in their final pre-season game.

Mid-Season Friendlies 
During the season, Arsenal played a number of friendlies at their training ground in London Colney. The dates and details of these matches are displayed below.

FA Community Shield

As Premier League and FA Cup winners, Arsenal contested the 2002 FA Community Shield against league runners-up Liverpool. Gilberto, making his debut for Arsenal in the second half as a substitute, scored the winning goal, in a match where the team missed numerous chances.

Premier League

A total of 20 teams competed in the Premier League in the 2002–03 season. Each team played 38 matches; two against every other team and one match at each club's stadium. Three points were awarded for each win, one point per draw, and none for defeats. At the end of the season the top two teams qualified for the group stages of the UEFA Champions League; teams in third and fourth needed to play a qualifier.

August–October

Arsenal began the season with a 2–0 home victory against promoted Birmingham City; goals from Thierry Henry and Sylvain Wiltord extended the club's winning run to fourteen matches – a new top-flight record. A late equaliser by Wiltord in their next match at West Ham United earned Arsenal a point, having trailed 2–0 in the first half. Three days later, a 5–2 win against West Bromwich Albion moved Arsenal to the top of the league table. Although they drew to Chelsea at Stamford Bridge, having lost captain Vieira through a sending-off, a win against Manchester City meant Arsenal leapfrogged local rivals Tottenham Hotspur to first position. A 3–0 win at Charlton Athletic on 15 September 2002 pleased Wenger, who indicated after the match the league was theirs to lose: "We know we can win the league. We know we can be stronger. At this stage last season we were not as good as we are now." Striker Kanu scored a stoppage time winner against Bolton Wanderers to win their eleventh successive home game.

At Elland Road, Leeds United hosted Arsenal on 28 September 2002. Goals from Kolo Touré and Henry and a brace from Kanu ensured Arsenal eclipsed Nottingham Forest's record of 22 away league games without defeat and scored in 47 consecutive league matches, breaking Chesterfield Town's achievement. Wenger hailed the performance as "edging nearer to perfection", adding it evoked memories of the Ajax team in the 1970s: "We are playing great, 'Total Football'. Danger comes from everywhere." Leeds manager Terry Venables agreed: "Manchester United have been exceptional for 10 years – but I've not seen anything as good as that."

Arsenal started October with a 3–1 win against Sunderland, breaking Manchester United's Premier League record of 30 matches unbeaten. They however suffered their first defeat of the season, against Everton; teenager Wayne Rooney scored from long range in the last minute of the match. Wenger used his post-match press conference to praise the striker: "At that age, Rooney is already a complete footballer. The guy can play. He's the best English under-20 I've seen since I came here [in 1996]." In spite of dominating their next match against Blackburn Rovers – "27 goal attempts, 14 on target," Arsenal were beaten 2–1; the winning goal was scored by Dwight Yorke in the second half. It was the team's third consecutive defeat in all competitions, their worst run since November 2000, and moved league leaders Liverpool four points clear at the top of the table.

November–February
A Steve Marlet own goal gave Arsenal a much-needed 1–0 win against Fulham, ceasing their run of four defeats on 3 November 2002. Another 1–0 win, this time against Newcastle United moved Arsenal one point behind leaders Liverpool. Vieira's performance in particular was plauded in The Guardian as a "demonstration of tackling, control, awareness and movement that was exceptional even by his standards." In the North London derby on 16 November 2002, Arsenal beat Tottenham Hotpsur 3–0 to go back at the top of the league table. The opening goal, scored by Henry was later voted the Goal of the Season by viewers of ITV's The Premiership, having picked up the ball from Arsenal's side of the pitch and running past the opposition defence to shoot past goalkeeper Kasey Keller. At St Mary's Stadium, Arsenal lost 3–2 to Southampton; striker James Beattie scored twice against an Arsenal defence, who conceded three goals in total for the first time since May 2001. Defender Sol Campbell had been sent off in the match, and was suspended for a further game, against Manchester United. Arsenal ended the month with a 3–1 victory over visitors Aston Villa; midfielder Robert Pires scoring for the second successive league match and Henry adding a further two goals.

Arsenal faced Manchester United at Old Trafford on 7 December 2002; the home team had beaten title challengers Liverpool the previous weekend. Manchester United opened the scoring in the 21st minute – a poor clearance by Cygan allowed Juan Sebastián Verón to score. Arsenal goalkeeper Rami Shaaban was substituted before the start of the second half, having pulled a thigh muscle. He was replaced by Stuart Taylor, who was helpless to prevent Paul Scholes from scoring a second goal, 15 minutes before the final whistle. A 1–1 draw at Tottenham Hotspur was followed by a win against Middlesbrough; a goal apiece from Campbell and Pires meant Arsenal were top of the table on Christmas. On Boxing Day, Arsenal came from a goal down to beat West Brom 2–1; in doing so, they extended their lead at the top to four points. Three days later, Arsenal's lead was increased to five points, having drawn with Liverpool.

In spite of conceding two late goals against Chelsea, Arsenal won by a solitary goal on New Year's Day to maintain their lead. Two goals from Henry against Birmingham City took his total for the club to 100 goals in all competitions; Wenger declared the display – a 4–0 win, as his team's best since beating Leeds United in September. Henry scored a hat-trick for Arsenal against West Ham United on 19 January 2003 but the team drew at Liverpool in spite of a polished performance; Emile Heskey headered the ball into the net, scoring for the home team after 90 minutes. On 1 February 2003, Pires scored a late goal against Fulham, extending Arsenal's lead to six points at the top. This was followed by a 1–1 draw against Newcastle United; manager Sir Bobby Robson after the game criticised referee Neale Barry for his decision to send off midfielder Laurent Robert and Dennis Bergkamp's role in the dismissal, suggesting he "wasn't trying to play the ball to anybody. He kicked the ball against Laurent – I've seen other players do that and I don't like it." Arsenal beat Manchester City 5–1 in their final trip to Maine Road on 22 February 2003. The first four goals, all scored before the half-hour, came at a time when "[Alex] Ferguson ordered the radio to be switched before they reached Old Trafford, presumably in ghastly silence."

March–May

On 2 March 2003, Arsenal opened up an eight-point lead at the top of the table, winning 2–0 against Charlton Athletic. The result was enough for Irish bookmaker Paddy Power to pay out on punters backing Arsenal to retain their lead, despite Manchester United having a game in hand. The gap was cut to two points after Arsenal suffered their first defeat in 2003, against Blackburn Rovers. By the time Arsenal played Everton on 23 March 2003, they were displaced at the top of the table by Manchester United. A goal by Vieira moved the team two points clear once more.

An own goal scored by Touré meant Freddie Ljungberg's opener against Aston Villa was cancelled out and the match ended in a draw, albeit helping Arsenal back to first position on goal difference. Leading up to the potential championship decider against Manchester United on 16 April 2003, Wenger was adamant his team were mentally ready to retain the title: "We want to be a team who makes history. That's what's really driving us on. We are not worrying about United too much. We are just concentrating on expressing our togetherness, our mental strength and our qualities. We have enough players who can win this game." Having conceded a first half goal scored by Ruud van Nistelrooy, Arsenal overturned Manchester United's lead before Ryan Giggs equalised for the away team. The match ended 2–2; Campbell was sent off for elbowing Ole Gunnar Solskjær and was banned the rest of the season, whereas Vieira limped off with an injury. Although the result helped Manchester United move back top, they had played one game more than Arsenal. Arsenal won their next match at Middlesbrough, but squandered a two-goal lead away to Bolton Wanderers in the last ten minutes. The result, "a big blow" for Arsenal's title hopes, meant the championship was now in Manchester United's favour.

With Manchester United beating Charlton Athletic 4–1 on 3 May 2003, Arsenal, a day later, needed a win against Leeds United to restore any hope of finishing top of the league. In a five-goal match, an 88th-minute goal by Mark Viduka ensured Leeds United's survival in the top division and Manchester United's recapture of the Premiership. Wenger revoked suggestion that the league campaign was a "failure", arguing his team were consistent:

Arsenal won their final two matches of the league season, against Southampton – where Pires and Jermaine Pennant both scored a hat-trick – and Sunderland, ending the season with 78 points.

Classification

Results summary

Results by round

FA Cup

Arsenal entered the competition in the third round, receiving a bye as a Premier League club. Their opening match was a 2–0 home win against Oxford United on 4 January 2003. Bergkamp scored his 100th goal for the club and an own goal by defender Scott McNiven ensured progression to the next round. Arsenal faced non-league side Farnborough Town but the match switched from Farnborough's ground at Cherrywood Road to Highbury due to concerns over safety. Farnborough as the home team began the match in disastrous fashion, conceding a goal scored by Campbell in the 19th minute, and going down to ten men after Christian Lee was sent off for a professional foul. Francis Jeffers scored twice before Rocky Baptiste added a consolation, beating Cygan for pace and despite having his first shot saved by goalkeeper Taylor, he managed to lift the ball over him and into the net. Lauren and Bergkamp each scored in the final 15 minutes to give Arsenal a 5–1 victory.

Arsenal's fifth round match was away to league rivals Manchester United at Old Trafford on 16 February 2003. After Giggs missed the chance to score past an open goal, midfielder Edu gave Arsenal the lead through a free kick which took a deflection off David Beckham's shoulder. Wiltord scored the second goal of the match in the 52nd minute, running onto a pass from Edu and side-footing the ball past goalkeeper Fabien Barthez. Vieira said of the performance: "We knew when we lost here in the league that we had lost the battle in midfield. We had to put that right, and we did." In the sixth round, Arsenal were drawn at home to Chelsea in a repeat of the previous season's final. Chelsea defender John Terry put his team ahead with a header from a set piece before Arsenal responded through Jeffers and Henry. Frank Lampard scored a late equaliser for the visiting team meaning the match was replayed at Stamford Bridge. An own goal by Terry and a strike by Wiltord in the space of seven minutes during the replay gave Arsenal an early lead against Chelsea. Despite going down to ten men after Cygan was sent off and Terry scoring from a header, the away team scored a third goal through Lauren to ensure progression into the semi-finals. In the semi-final against Sheffield United on 13 April 2003 at Old Trafford, Ljungberg scored the winning goal to help Arsenal reach their third successive FA Cup final appearance. The match was remembered for Seaman, who on his 1,000th appearance in senior football produced a late save to deny Sheffield United from equalising.

In the 2003 FA Cup Final against Southampton, a goal from Pires, scored in the first half was enough to ensure Arsenal won their ninth FA Cup, becoming the first team to retain the trophy in over 20 years. Wenger commented after the game that his team "got the trophy we wanted" while defender Martin Keown said the FA Cup win was "the best ever". Winning captain David Seaman felt the disappointment of losing out to Manchester United in the league spurred the team on.

League Cup

Together with the other clubs playing in European football, Arsenal entered the Football League Cup in the third round, where they were drawn at home to Premier League club Sunderland. Although Arsenal went two goals ahead in the first half, Sunderland responded, scoring three times in 15 minutes. The result was Wenger's fifth defeat in six matches.

UEFA Champions League

Group stage

Arsenal were drawn in Group A, along with German club Borussia Dortmund, Dutch champions PSV Eindhoven and French side Auxerre. A deflected goal by Bergkamp and a counterattack, finished off by Ljungberg on his comeback from injury gave Arsenal the perfect start in the group stages, at home to Borussia Dortmund. At the Philips Stadion, Arsenal produced an impressive display against PSV, winning 4–0. It was their first win in European football away from home in 19 months and the match set a new club record, as Gilberto scored the fastest goal in the competition at 20.07 seconds.

Against Auxerre, Gilberto scored for the second successive matchday to take Arsenal to nine points, but goals from Olivier Kapo and Khalilou Fadiga in the return game inflicted Arsenal's first defeat in the Champions League. In spite of taking the lead against Borussia Dortmund on Matchday 5, Arsenal conceded two goals to lose 2–1. A fourth straight defeat represented the club's worst run in 19 years but with PSV beating Auxerre, Arsenal qualified for the second group stage with a game to spare – that match ending in a 0–0 draw against PSV.

Second group stage

Henry scored his first hat-trick in Europe for Arsenal against Roma on 27 November 2002 with the player stating; "It's wonderful to score a hat-trick but it's even more important that I did so in a game we've won." The result was followed with four consecutive draws – three at home against Roma, Valencia and Ajax. Arsenal only needed a draw to progress into the knockout stages, but lost 2–1 to Valencia at the Mestalla on 19 March 2003. Reflecting later on the Champions League campaign, Wenger commented that "we lost our qualification at home".

Player statistics
Arsenal used a total of 30 players during the 2002–03 season and there were 17 different goalscorers. There were also two squad members who did not make a first-team appearance in the campaign. Henry featured in 55 matches, three of which he came on as a substitute.

The team scored a total of 112 goals in all competitions. The highest goalscorer was Henry, with 32 goals, followed by Pires who scored 16 goals. Four Arsenal players were sent off during the season: Vieira, Cygan, Campbell (twice) and Touré.

Key

No. = Squad number

Pos = Playing position

Nat. = Nationality

Apps = Appearances

GK = Goalkeeper

DF = Defender

MF = Midfielder

FW = Forward

 = Yellow cards

 = Red cards

Numbers in parentheses denote appearances as substitute. Players with number struck through and marked  left the club during the playing season.

Source:

See also
 2002–03 in English football
 List of Arsenal F.C. seasons

Notes

References

Arsenal
Arsenal F.C. seasons